Rakino is a rural locality (a village) in Chernushinsky District, Perm Krai, Russia. The population was 338 as of 2010. There are 2 streets.

Geography 
Rakino is located 9 km northwest of Chernushka (the district's administrative centre) by road. Brod is the nearest rural locality.

References 

Rural localities in Chernushinsky District